Pidavoor  is a village in KOLLAM district in the state of Kerala, India.
Pidavoor situated near the Pathanapuram town. Pidavoor is a part of Thalavoor Grama Panchayat. It is the eighth ward of Thalavoor panchayat. It is the border of Thalavoor and Pathanapuram Panchayat. The river Kalladayar divides these two panchayats.

Politics

Pidavoor is the part of Pathanapuram legislative assembly in Mavelikara (Lok Sabha constituency). Shri. Kodikkunnil Suresh is the present member of parliament. Shri.K. B. Ganesh Kumar is the current MLA of Pathanapuram.

Demographics
 India census, Pidavoor had a population of 10087 with 4858 males and 5229 females.

References

Villages in Kollam district